Arthamulla Aasaigal is a 1985 Indian Tamil-language film directed by Babu Maharaja for Peninsula Productions. The film stars Karthik, Ambika,
Anand Babu and Sadhana.

Plot 
 
Selvam  is a poor fisherman in the town of Mullaipattinam. He struggles to feed his family and is determined to become rich by any means. He clashes with Radha, the daughter of  Krishnan, the richest man in town. With no job and little prospects left in town, Selvam leaves for Madras and quickly finds a place with a group of smugglers. Prabhu, the leader of the group, acquires foreign goods and opium from Shanthakumar  and sells them on the black market. Selvam makes money in his new job but also attracts the attention of Customs Inspector Ganesh. In a twist of fate, he befriends Ganesh's younger brother Anand Babu. Selvam also meets Radha again, and they soon fall in love. Shanthakumar and Prabhu end their partnership as the former is distrustful of Prabhu's girlfriend Ganga. Krishnan learns of Radha and Selvam's love affair and opposes it as he's promised Radha's hand in marriage to Prabhu. Selvam loses his position with Prabhu's organization and begins to work with Shantakumar. He soon becomes very rich and powerful. Selvam builds a mansion for his mother and sister Jaya. Anand and Jaya meet at a dance class and fall for each other. Selvam is supportive of their love, but Ganesh is hesitant to allow his brother to marry a smuggler's sister. He will allow the wedding to take place only after Selvam surrenders for his crimes. Prabhu is determined to destroy Selvam and marry Radha. Selvam finds himself cornered by law enforcement as he struggles to arrange Jaya's marriage to Anand and rescue Radha from Prabhu.

Cast 

Karthik as Selvam
Ambika as Radha
Anand Babu as Anand Babu
Sadhana as Jaya
Jaishankar as Customs Inspector Ganesh
Sathyaraj as Prabhu
Thengai Srinivasan as Krishnan
Nalinikanth as Shanthakumar
Senthil
Anuradha as Ganga
Loose Mohan
Pandari Bai as Selvam and Jaya's mother
Ennatha Kannaiya as Kannaiya
Kullamani as Naidu

Soundtrack 

Lyrics were by Vaali, Pulamaipithan, Muthulingam, and Gangai Amaran. 
"Neram Ippo" - Gangai Amaran
"Paartha Paarvaiyile" - Malaysia Vasudevan
"Katchatheevil" - Vani Jairam
"Kaalam Neram" - Malaysia Vasudevan, Gangai Amaran, S. Janaki
"Intha Vaanam Antha Megam" - S. P. Balasubrahmanyam, S. P. Sailaja
"Yamma Yamma Summa" - Malaysia Vasudevan, S. Janaki

References

External links 
 

1980 films
1985 films
1980s Tamil-language films
Indian action drama films
Films scored by Gangai Amaran
1980s action drama films